Weerathep Pomphan (born 19 September 1996) is a Thai professional footballer who plays as a defensive midfielder for Thai League 1 club Muangthong United and the Thailand national team.

International career
On 12 April 2021, Weerathep was named in Thailand's 47-man preliminary squad for the 2022 World Cup qualification phase. He was also called up to play for Thailand at the 2020 AFF Championship.

Career statistics

International

International Goals

U23 (Wildcard)

Honours

Club
Chamchuri United
 Regional League Bangkok Area Division (1): 2016

International
Thailand
 AFF Championship (2): 2020, 2022

Thailand U-23
 Southeast Asian Games  Silver medal: 2021

References

External links

1996 births
Living people
Weerathep Pomphan
Weerathep Pomphan
Association football midfielders
Weerathep Pomphan
Weerathep Pomphan
Weerathep Pomphan
Competitors at the 2021 Southeast Asian Games
Weerathep Pomphan